Gellilydan is a village in the Welsh county of Gwynedd, in Maentwrog community.

The village has a local pub by the name of Bryn Arms which was built by two brothers, Ellis and Norman Richards, who named the pub after their father.

References

Villages in Gwynedd
Villages in Snowdonia
Maentwrog